The 2016 United States presidential election in Idaho was held on Tuesday, November 8, 2016, as part of the 2016 United States presidential election in which all 50 states plus the District of Columbia participated. Idaho voters chose electors to represent them in the Electoral College via a popular vote, pitting the Republican Party's nominee, businessman Donald Trump, and running mate Indiana Governor Mike Pence against Democratic Party nominee, former Secretary of State Hillary Clinton, and her running mate Virginia Senator Tim Kaine. Idaho has four electoral votes in the Electoral College.

Trump was expected to win Idaho; Idaho is a Republican stronghold that has not voted for a Democratic candidate for president since Lyndon B. Johnson's national landslide in 1964, and even then the state was close. Trump ultimately carried the state with 59.25% of the vote, while Clinton received 27.48%. Third party candidate Evan McMullin carried 6.75% of the popular vote, making Idaho his second-strongest state, only after neighboring Utah.

Primaries and Caucuses

Republican primary

With only a thousand dollar filing fee, thirteen candidates appear on the Republican presidential primary ballot:

Democratic caucuses

Constitution primary
The Constitution Party of Idaho held its primary on March 8.

Polling

General election

Predictions

Results

By county

Results by congressional district
Trump won both congressional districts.

See also
 United States presidential elections in Idaho
 Presidency of Donald Trump
 2016 Democratic Party presidential debates and forums
 2016 Democratic Party presidential primaries
 2016 Republican Party presidential debates and forums
 2016 Republican Party presidential primaries

References

External links
 RNC 2016 Republican Nominating Process 
 Green papers for 2016 primaries, caucuses, and conventions
 Decision Desk Headquarter Results for Idaho

ID
2016
Presidential